Doi Lan is a mountain in Thailand, part of the Phi Pan Nam Range, in the center of Chiang Rai Province, south of Chiang Rai Town.
With a height of 559 metres Doi Lan gives its name to the Doi Lan Subdistrict of Mueang Chiang Rai District.

This mountain is a small karstic mountain that rises north of the Buddhist temple named Phrathat Doi Lan after it.

See also
Thai highlands
List of mountains in Thailand

References

Phi Pan Nam Range
Mountains of Thailand
Geography of Chiang Rai province